The San Antonio City Council is the legislative arm of the municipal government of the city of San Antonio in the U.S. state of Texas. It consists of 10 members elected from single-member districts.

San Antonio has a council-manager form of government in which the city manager, Erik Walsh, is the city's main, albeit unelected, executive. The mayor of San Antonio presides over the city council; Ron Nirenberg was elected to his third term as mayor in June 2021.

Composition

San Antonio is divided into 10 districts for purposes of electoral representation in the council. Candidates are elected to office in non-partisan races. The council members are, as of June 2021, as follows:

Council Committees

There are 10 committees on which San Antonio council members may serve. Each committee is listed here with its current Chair, as of March 2021:

Election 
San Antonio municipal elections are held every two years in May, with runoffs scheduled in June, if necessary. Council members from all ten districts and the mayoral office are up for election during each of these municipal elections. Since 2008, council members and mayors are limited to a total of four two-year terms.

Salary 
Each council member receive $45,722 annually while the mayor receives $61,725.

References

Government of San Antonio
Texas city councils